Spatangus is a genus of heart urchins in the Spatangidae family. The genus is synonymous with the previously recognised genera Prospatangus Lambert, 1902 and Spatagus. There are nine recognised species. The type species is Spatangus purpureus Müller, 1776 by subsequent designation (Rowe & Gates, 1995).

Spatangus comprises marine heart urchins that feed on subsurface deposits and graze.

Fossil of heart urchins of this genus have been found in the sediments of Europe, United States, Egypt and Australia from Cretaceous to Pliocene (age range: 85.8 to 2.588 Ma).

Species
Species within this genus include:
 Spatangus altus Mortensen, 1907
 Spatangus baixadoleitensis Maury, 1934a †
 Spatangus beryl Fell, 1963
 Spatangus brissus
 Spatangus californicus H.L. Clark, 1917
 Spatangus capensis Döderlein, 1905
 Spatangus diomedeae Fell, 1963
 Spatangus glenni Cooke, 1959 †
 Spatangus inermis Mortensen, 1913
 Spatangus luetkeni A. Agassiz, 1872
 Spatangus lutkeni A. Agassiz, 1872
 Spatangus mathesoni McKnight, 1968
 Spatangus multispinus Mortensen, 1925
 Spatangus pallidus H.L. Clark, 1908
 Spatangus paucituberculatus A. Agassiz & H.L. Clark, 1907
 Spatangus purpureus (O.F. Müller, 1776)
 Spatangus raschi Lovén, 1869
 Spatangus savignyi Fourtau
 Spatangus subinermis Pomel, 1887
 Spatangus tapinus Schenck, 1928 †
 Spatangus thor Fell, 1963

References

 
 J. E. Gray. 1825. An attempt to divide the Echinida, or Sea Eggs, into natural families. Annals of Philosophy, new series 10:423-431

 
Spatangidae
Santonian genus first appearances
Extant Santonian first appearances
Echinoidea genera